Anthemis cretica subsp. carpatica, the snow carpet, is a subspecies of flowering plant in the genus Anthemis and in the family Asteraceae. It may also be treated as a full species, Anthemis carpatica.

External links

Anthemis carpatica

cretica subsp. carpatica
Plant subspecies
Flora of Romania
Plants described in 1803
Flora of the Carpathians